Werner Sczesny is a German major general of Bundeswehr and commander of the forces intelligent department, Strategic Reconnaissance Command.

Sczesny joined the Bundeswehr in 1978 as a conscript in the light engineer battalion 15 in Cologne. In 1980, he completed the officer course as an officer candidate. He than studied pedagogics at the Helmut Schmidt University of Bundeswehr, Hamburg.  After a career in the German armed forces he became major general in 2016 and became Vize-president for the military units of federal intelligent service (Bundesnachrichtendienstes BND). Since 2021, he is commander of the military  intelligent department.

References

Living people
People of the Federal Intelligence Service
1969 births